Avire is a city in Vanuatu. It gave its name to the Martian crater Aviré.

Populated places in Vanuatu
Tafea Province